Rare Junk is the third album from The Nitty Gritty Dirt Band, released in 1968. In an attempt to update their sound the band included electric instrumentation on the record, but it still was a commercial failure.

Track listing
"Mournin' Blues" (Tony Sbarbaro) – 3:24
"Collegiana" (Jimmy McHugh, Dorothy Fields) – 2:38
"Willie the Weeper" (Grant Rymal, Walter Melrose, Marty Bloom) – 2:26
"Cornbread and 'Lasses (Sassafrass Tea)" (Lloyd "Lonzo" George, Rollin "Oscar" Sullivan) – 2:31
"These Days" (Jackson Browne) – 3:13
"Sadie Green The Vamp of New Orleans" (Gilbert Wells, Johnny Dunn) – 2:25
"Dr. Heckle and Mr. Jibe" (Dick McDonough) – 2:37
"End Of Your Line" (Chris Farrel) – 2:22
"Reason to Believe" (Tim Hardin) – 2:54
"Hesitation Blues (Oh! Baby Must I Hesitate?)" (Billy Smythe, Scott Middleton, Art Gillham) – 3:26
"A Number and a Name" (Steve Gillette, Tom Campbell) – 3:20

Personnel
Nitty Gritty Dirt Band
Ralph Barr – electric guitar, clarinet, acoustic guitar
John McEuen – piano, plectrum banjo, five-string banjar
Jeff Hanna – washboard, tambourine, drum, guitar, harmonica, electric guitar ...and other rare junk
Jimmie Fadden – tube, jug, mouth harp, harmonica, washtub bass, drums
Les Thompson – guitar, mandolin, electric bass, tambourine, plectrum banjo
Chris Darrow – guitar, mandolin, violin, fiddle, electric bass, string bass
Contributing musicians
Bernie Leadon – guitar on "Reason to Believe"
Johnny Sandlin – drums
Paul Hornsby – piano
Rodney Dillard – Dobro

Production
Producer – Dallas Smith

References
All information is from the album liner notes, unless otherwise noted.

Nitty Gritty Dirt Band albums
1968 albums
Liberty Records albums